Rafi Ahmed Kidwai (18 February 1894 – 24 October 1954) was a politician, an Indian independence activist and a socialist. He hailed from Barabanki District of Uttar Pradesh, in north India.

Early life
Rafi Ahmed was born in the village of Masauli, in Barabanki district (now in Uttar Pradesh).

Death
Kidwai died in Delhi on 24 October 1954. He had heart failure after experiencing an attack of asthma while delivering a speech. His burial site, at his home village, was covered by a Mughal-style mausoleum.  According to historian Paul Brass, "A formidable fund-raiser for Congress movements and elections, he distributed his largesse to all and sundry, but died in debt, leaving behind only a decaying house in his home village."

Legacy
The Rafi Ahmed Kidwai Award was created in 1956 by the Indian Council of Agricultural Research (ICAR) to recognize Indian researchers in the agricultural field. Awards are distributed every second year, and take the form of medals, citations, and cash prizes.

In November 2011, the Postal Staff College in Ghaziabad was named as the Rafi Ahmed Kidwai National Postal Academy. There is also a street named after him in Kolkata.

There is a street named after him in Wadala Mumbai.

The Parliament of India has a portrait of Kidwai in a Committee Room.

Rafi Ahmed Kidwai also played a major role in donating 20 acres of the campus land and Rs. 100,000 for the radiotherapy machine for the establishment of cancer care hospital in Bangalore Karnataka state, India which is named after him - Kidwai memorial institute of oncology.

References

Further reading
 M. Bassien, ed., Who's who in legislature, 1 (1953)
 M. Weiner, Party politics in India: the development of a multi-party system (1957)
 P. N. Chopra, Rafi Ahmad Kidwai: his life and work (1960)
 S. Sunder and S. Shyam, Political life of Pandit Govind Ballabh Pant, 1: 1887–1945 (1960)
 Sampurnanand, Memories and reflections (1962)
 A. P. Jain, Rafi Ahmad Kidwai: a memoir of his life and times (1965)
 P. R. Brass, Factional politics in an Indian state: the Congress Party in Uttar Pradesh (1966)
 S. Gopal, Jawaharlal Nehru: a biography, 2: 1947–1956 (1979)
 V. Menon, From movement to government: the Congress in the United Provinces, 1937–42 (2003)
 M. Hasan, From pluralism to separatism: qasbas in colonial Awadh (2004)

External links

 Biography from the Government of India's Ministry of Information

1894 births
1954 deaths
First Nehru ministry
Indian Muslims
Indian independence activists from Uttar Pradesh
Aligarh Muslim University alumni
Indian socialists
People from Barabanki district
India MPs 1952–1957
Members of the Central Legislative Assembly of India
Prisoners and detainees of British India
Members of the Constituent Assembly of India
Lok Sabha members from Uttar Pradesh
People from Bahraich district
Muslim socialists